Brezovica pri Mirni is a small settlement in the Municipality of Mirna in southeastern Slovenia. The area is part of the traditional region of Lower Carniola. The municipality is now included in the Southeast Slovenia Statistical Region.

Name
The name of the settlement was changed from Brezovica to Brezovica pri Mirni in 1953.

References

External links

Brezovica pri Mirni on Geopedia

Populated places in the Municipality of Mirna